(also written as ; from the word keyūra in Sanskrit which was transliterated into  in China) is a ring-shaped neck ornament or fashion jewellery of Buddhist origins in ancient China with its earliest prototypes having roots in ancient India. The  depicted as decorative Buddhist art elements and was later imitated and turned into an actual elegant necklace by the Tang dynasty. It was then widely adopted as a classical necklace in Chinese society for centuries  and as a head-wear. The  could also be used as a textile pattern which would applied on Chinese clothing. The  gradually lost popularity as it lost its appeal due to the changes in people's sense of aesthetic and aesthetic needs in modern times. However, it currently continues to be worn as a common modern-day hanfu accessory by Hanfu enthusiasts since the Hanfu movement and can appear in various styles and materials.

Construction and design

jewellery 
The  is a ring-shaped necklace. As a necklace, it comes in various styles and shape. It was generally made of gold, jade, pearls, and other precious materials. It also often featured suspended beads combined with auspicious trinkets or motifs rooted in Chinese culture.

Origins in ancient India 

The prototype of the  originated from ancient India where it was an Indian ornament known as keyūra, muktā-hāra, rucaka, hāra (हार) in Sanskrit, usually worn by the nobles of ancient India. The keyūra was not only used as a neck ornament. It was a body ornament which could be worn at the chest, arms, legs, and feet; it could also be worn as a crown or a head ornament, or as a bracelet which was made of gems and precious metals and knitted with string. Following the emergence of Buddhism, the keyūra became an ornament for Buddhist statues and Bodhisattva figures.

China 
The  depicted as decorative Buddhist art elements was often depicted on the bodies of Bodhisattva and was also one of its main decorative element. They were also concrete characteristics of the Dunhuang decorative arts which were constantly evolving and enriching itself. The Eastern Wei dynasty and the Northern Qi dynasty period, especially, was a period of cultural integration and cultural exchange which resulted in the  becoming a relatively unique new fashion. For example, some bodhisattva figures in China dating from the second half of the 6th century AD wear extraordinary jewellery which already displayed Chinese stylistic art and innovations in iconography as well as influences from Non-Chinese culture, including Central Asian tradition in material culture.

The  used as decorative elements in Buddhist arts was eventually imitated and transformed into an actual necklace by the Tang dynasty and was also adopted by the Khitan people of the Liao dynasty. The  eventually became a classical neck jewellery in China while still remaining in use as a decorative ornaments in Chinese Buddhist iconography.

Japan 
In Japan, the keyūra was known as  where it was used as Buddhist art elements decorating Buddhist statues and shrines.

See also 
 Hanfu
 List of hanfu
 List of hanfu accessories
 Chaozhu (Court necklace)
 Lock charm

References

External links 

 Images of modern yingluo and ancient yingluo in arts

Chinese traditional clothing
Jade
Hardstone carving
Chinese art